The Institute for Nonprofit News (INN) is a non-profit consortium of journalism organizations. The organization promotes nonprofit investigative and public service journalism through its association of member entities.

History
INN was founded as the Investigative News Network in 2009 at a summer conference held at the Pocantico Center in New York funded by the Rockefeller Brothers Fund, the Surdna Foundation and the William Penn Foundation and organized by the Center for Public Integrity and the Center for Investigative Reporting. The result of that conference was the Pocantico Declaration, which begins:

Resolved, that we, representatives of nonprofit news organizations, gather at a time when investigative reporting, so crucial to a functioning democracy, is under threat. There is an urgent need to nourish and sustain the emerging investigative journalism ecosystem to better serve the public.

INN was granted 501(c)(3) non-profit status by the IRS in March 2012, 19 months after applying.

As of March 2019, INN had 189 members. The nonprofit members are part of a growing movement in news media to provide watchdog journalism that is not covered in mainstream media.

INN operating and project budgets are underwritten through a combination of grants from the John S. and James L. Knight Foundation, Rockefeller Brothers Fund, Open Society Foundations, Ethics and Excellence in Journalism Foundation and other charitable foundations.

In November 2014, the board of INN met to conduct a strategic review of the organization. During that meeting the board decided to refine the organization's and to change its name from "Investigative News Network" to the "Institute for Nonprofit News". In March 2015, the board voted to terminate the organization's first CEO, Kevin Davis, and appoint data reporter Denise Malan as the interim CEO while a search was conducted to find a permanent replacement. In September 2015, Sue Cross, formerly a consultant and before that a long-time employee of AP was hired as the new Executive Director and CEO.

Activities

As a 501(c)3 non-profit education organization, INN provides coordination, training, support services and financial sponsorship to its membership. It has published educational resources and training materials, including a whitepaper, "Audience Development and Distribution Strategies", and regular articles by experts in the fields of business and journalism.

In 2011, INN joined the Thomson Reuters media platform.

In 2012, INN developed "Project Largo", a WordPress theme and CMS platform for news websites based on NPR's Project Argo that is used by member organizations in New Orleans, Connecticut, Maine, Iowa, Oklahoma and elsewhere.

The Community Journalism Executive Training (CJET) program was started by INN in 2012 to provide business training to members.

In 2013, INN's CEO Kevin Davis consulted on a nonprofit media working group for the Council on Foundations to produce a report titled "The IRS and Nonprofit Media". The report urges the IRS to update its approach to granting charity status to non-profit journalism organizations.

Since 2016, INN has partnered with NewsMatch, an initiative supported by several national foundations that match donations from individuals to nonprofit news organizations.

Organizational structure

Funding 
INN is supported by individual contributions and grants awarded by charitable foundations. A list of INN's funders may be found on the organization's official website.  INN's filings with the Internal Revenue Service and a progress report are also available on the organization's website.  In 2009, INN raised $212,701. In 2011, INN reported $649,300 in revenues and $633,590 in expenses.

INN reports receiving foundation support from a number of foundations, including the Ethics and Excellence in Journalism Foundation, the John D. and Catherine T. MacArthur Foundation, the John S. and James L. Knight Foundation, the Open Society Foundations, the Atlantic Philanthropies, the Robert R. McCormick Foundation, the Hewlett Foundation, the Democracy Fund and the Rockefeller Brothers Fund.

Board of directors 
INN's board of directors includes Laura Frank (chair), Brant Houston (secretary), Reginald Chua (treasurer), Anne Galloway, Sheila Krumholz, Marcia Parker, Norberto Santana Jr., Nancy West, Neal Shapiro, Bruce Theriault, and Hsiu Mei Wong.

Awards 
INN was the winner of the 2011 Manship Prize at Louisiana State University, and was honored at the 1913 Dinner Friday, Sept. 9, 2011.

Editorial collaborations 
INN has facilitated multiple editorial collaborations including:

Sexual Assault on Campus: A Frustrating Search for Justice  – Starting in February 2009, the Center for Public Integrity fielded a team of reporters and researchers to lift the curtain on how colleges and universities respond to reports of sexual assault.

Aviation Database Reveals Frequent Safety Problems at Airports – A six-month examination of more than 150,000 reports filed by pilots and others in the aviation industry over the past 20 years reveals surprising and sometimes shocking safety breaches and close calls at local, regional and major airports throughout the country.

Deadly Patrols: Abuses of Civilians by U.S. Border Patrol Agents This series is the result of a months-long collaboration among the newsrooms, which shared documents, reporting and interviews. The multi-platform collaborative project, coordinated by INN, documented allegations of mistreatment and investigated every death involving border agents. Reporters found that the number of fatal incidents is growing even as both assaults on Border Patrol agents and the number of immigrants attempting to cross the border illegally is in decline.

Wasted Places: EPA Program Falls Short in Toxic Site Cleanups is a collaborative investigation by six nonprofit newsrooms into federal and state programs designed to clean up and redevelop polluted tracts known as "brownfields". The project was reported and written by the Connecticut Health Investigative Team, City Limits, Iowa Center for Public Affairs Journalism, the New England Center for Investigative Reporting, the Wisconsin Center for Investigative Journalism and INN.

Big Political Donors Give Far and Wide, Influence Out-of-State Races and Issues is an analysis of contributions by wealthy individuals in seven states shows that their giving is greater than any one cause or race reveals—with millions flowing into state, federal and even local campaigns, parties and committees far and wide.

"Exhausted at School" – Several INN members used mapping software to pinpoint schools that are located very close to major highways, potentially putting schoolchildren at risk of asthma and higher absenteeism rates caused by pollution. The project was supported by the Investigative Reporters and Editors and Google Ideas Data Journalism Fund and led by INN and InvestigateWest, an award-winning journalism studio in Seattle.

"Hazardous materials transportation"  Members including IowaWatch and MinnPost analyzed U.S. Department of Transportation data for their state to show how often there are accidents and spills involving hazardous materials.

Sustainability of nonprofit newsrooms 
INN's mission is focused on helping nonprofit newsrooms achieve sustainability as self-sustaining, mission-driven nonprofit newsrooms focused on meeting the information needs of citizens and communities.  To that end, in 2012 INN released the white paper entitled "Audience Development and Distribution Strategies" authored by Elizabeth Osder with assistance from Kaizar Campwala.  Printed in limited run and available for download for free from both the INN website and from iTunes, the paper focuses on documenting best-practices from both within the network as well as for-profit media partners.

In 2013, INN member I-News merged with Rocky Mountain PBS and Denver-based NPR affiliate KUVO in what is a first of its kind merger between public broadcasters and INN members.  Mergers of this type are expected to continue as nonprofit newsrooms look to create efficiencies in serving communities across media and platforms.

References

External links
 INN Home page
 INN in Nieman Journalism Lab's Encyclopedia
 INN in Rockefeller Brothers Fund description of INN and founding at The Pocantico Center

American journalism organizations
Investigative journalism
News agencies based in the United States
Charities based in California
American news websites
Organizations established in 2009
Trade associations based in the United States
Journalism-related professional associations
Non-profit organizations based in California
2009 establishments in California